Daire Gray (born 1998) is an Irish hurler who plays for Dublin Senior Championship club Whitehall Colmcille and at inter-county level with the Dublin senior hurling team. He usually lines out as a wing-back. He went to Larkhill BNS and St Aidans CBS in Whitehall.

Career

A member of the Whitehall Colmcille club in Whitehall, Gray first came to prominence on the inter-county scene as a member of the Dublin minor team that won the 2016 Leinster Championship. He subsequently lined out with the Dublin under-21 team as well as with DCU Dóchas Éireann in the Fitzgibbon Cup. Gray was added to the Dublin senior panel in 2017 before making his debut against Galway during the 2019 league.

Career statistics

Honours

Dublin 
Leinster Minor Hurling Championship: 2016

References

External links
Daire Gray profile at the Dublin GAA website

1998 births
Living people
Whitehall Colmcille hurlers
Dublin inter-county hurlers
People educated at St Aidan's C.B.S.